Dato' Jaafar bin Haji Muhammad (Jawi: جعفر بن محمد, b. 1838 – d. 3 July 1919) D.K., S.P.M.J., C.M.G. was the first and longest serving Dato' Menteri Besar (Chief Minister) of the independent kingdom of Johor (today a state in the Malaysian Federation), an office he held from 1886 until his death.

Early life
Jaafar was born in Teluk Belanga, Singapore, Straits Settlements. He also received Malay and English education.

Career
He began serving with the Johor state government at the age of 16, working as a trainee clerk in the Office of the Minister Raja Temenggong Daeng Ibrahim. In 1856 he was appointed clerk in the Office of the Minister, and then he served as deputy for the Chief Minister until 1882. He was Sultan Abu Bakar's escort in the latter's first trip to Europe in 1866. He took office when Temenggong Abu Bakar made himself Sultan and created a bureaucratic administration for Johor in 1885. During his term as Chief Minister, Jaafar was tasked to carry out state administration for the he went overseas. His residence for most of the latter part of his life was Istana Bukit Senyum which was built in 1883 and a high school behind the palace, Sekolah Dato' Jaafar is named after him. In 1904 he was appointed by Sultan Ibrahim, Abu Bakar's son and successor as regent.

Personal life
Jaafar was married five times with five wives, Esah bte Ibrahim, Emon bte Abu Talib, Datin Selamah Ambak and Rogayah Hanim. Three of his sons were also Menteri Besar after him, including the father of modern Malay nationalism, Dato' Onn Jaafar.

Death
He died in 1919 in Bukit Senyum, Johor Bahru and was buried with full honors at the Mahmoodiah Royal Mausoleum.

Honours
 :
 Knight Grand Commander of the Order of the Crown of Johor (SPMJ) – Dato' (1886)
 Grand Commander of the Royal Family Order of Johor (DK I) (1903)
 :
 Honorary Companion of the Order of St Michael and St George (CMG)

References 

1838 births
1919 deaths
Malaysian people of Malay descent
Chief Ministers of Johor
Johor state executive councillors
People from Johor

First Classes of the Royal Family Order of Johor
Knights Grand Commander of the Order of the Crown of Johor

Honorary Companions of the Order of St Michael and St George